Sea balls (also known as Aegagropila or Pillae marinae) are tightly packed balls of fibrous marine material, recorded from the seashore. Others have been reported at Dingle Bay in Ireland  and at Valencia, Spain. They may occur in hundreds and are composed of plant material, in majority seagrass rhizome netting torn out by water movement.

In recent years they have been shown to contain more and more plastic marine debris and even microplastics.

Gallery

References

Aquatic ecology
Ecotoxicology
Ocean pollution
Oceanographical terminology
Waste